Payne's Folly is a historic home located at Fawn Township, York County, Pennsylvania. It was built about 1750, and is a -story, four bay by two bay stone early Germanic dwelling. It measures 36 feet by 24 feet and has a full basement and steep gable roof.  It is built into a hillside.

It was added to the National Register of Historic Places in 1986.

References

Houses on the National Register of Historic Places in Pennsylvania
Houses completed in 1750
Houses in York County, Pennsylvania
National Register of Historic Places in York County, Pennsylvania